The Astrology of Personality is a book by Dane Rudhyar first published in New York in 1936 by Lucis Publishing Company (Lucis Trust). It was subsequently released in 1963 in the Netherlands by Servire/Wassenaar and again with a new preface in New York in 1970 by Doubleday.  The book discusses astrology from a psychological or "person-centered" perspective as opposed to the physiological and elemental perspective of many works on astrology.

Mostly recently, (2004), it has been published by Kessinger Publishing Co.

References 

Rudhyar, Dane The Astrology of Personality New York: 1970 Doubleday, first published New York: 1936 Lucis Publishing Company
Morang, Alfred Dane Rudhyar: Pioneer in Creative Synthesis 1939 Whitefish, Montana: 2004 Kessinger Publishing, first published New York: 1939 Lucis Publishing Company
Rudhyar, Dane Person Centered Astrology Santa Fe, NM: 1980 Aurora Press

1936 books
Astrological texts
Personality
Psychological astrology